The Mid-York Color Guard Circuit is a regional color guard (also known as winter guard) circuit in the U.S. state of New York. It was created in 1965. .

Current members of MYCGC
The current members of the Mid-York Circuit are based on the 2023 competition season. Many schools have more than one competing group under their name in different classes

Elementary Regional A 

Baldwinsville ERA, Baldwinsville, NY
Central Square ERA, Central Square, NY
Laurens ERA, Laurens, NY
Pinewood Elementary, Schenectady, NY
Phoenix ERA, Phoenix, NY

Cadet 
Cicero-North Syracuse Northstars Jr., North Syracuse, NY
East Syracuse-Minoa HS JV, East Syracuse, NY
Shenendehowa Cadet, Clifton Park, NY
Westmoreland Jr., Westmoreland, NY

Scholastic Regional A 

Baldwinsville HS JV, Baldwinsville, NY
Corning-Painted Post HS, Corning, NY
Greater Johnstown HS, Johnstown, NY
Horseheads HS, Horseheads, NY
Jordan-Elbridge HS Var., Jordan, NY
Norwich HS, Norwich, NY
Phoenix HS Jr., Phoenix, NY
Union-Endicott HS, Endicott, NY
Vestal HS Jr., Vestal, NY

Independent Regional A 
Black Knights JV, Rome, NY
Homer HS, Homer, NY
Liverpool JV, Liverpool, NY
Mohonasen HS JV, Schenectady, NY
New Hartford HS JV, New Hartford, NY
Oswego HS, Oswego, NY

Independent All Age 
Albany IAA, Albany, NY
Dare, Binghamton, NY

Scholastic A 3 

Black Knights Var., Rome, NY
Central Square HS JV, Central Square, NY
Greece HS, Greece, NY
Shenendehowa HS A, Clifton Park, NY
Vestal HS Sr, Vestal, NY
Westmoreland HS Sr., Westmoreland, NY

Scholastic A 2 
Baldwinsville HS Var., Baldwinsville, NY
Cicero-North Syracuse HS Northstars JV, Cicero, NY
East Syracuse-Minoa HS Var., East Syracuse, NY
Laurens Jaguars, Laurens, NY
West Genesee HS, Camillus, NY

Scholastic A 1 

Arlington HS Admirals, LaGrangeville, NY
Liverpool HS Var., Liverpool, NY
Mohonasen HS Var., Schenectady, NY
New Hartford HS Var., New Hartford, NY
Phoenix HS Sr., Phoenix, NY

Independent A 

 Introspective Independent, Endicott, NY

Scholastic Open 
Central Square HS Var., Central Square, NY 
Cicero-North Syracuse HS Var., Cicero, NY
Shenendehowa HS Open, Clifton Park, NY

Hall of Fame
Created in 2009, the Hall of Fame is given to individuals how have had an influence on MYCGC and have left a great impact.

The George Cowburn Award

Robert Morse Memorial Award 
With the inception of this award in 2004 the recipients are chosen by the by the Mid York Color Guard Circuit Directors. Each year the unit directors of the Mid York circuit, vote on the most improved guard of the season in honor of Robert Morse.

Class winners (2000-current)
Championships were not held in 2020 due to the Covid-19 Pandemic. Championships in 2021 were virtual with no scores or placements awarded.

Regional A Class Champions

A Class Champions

Open & World Champions

WGI medalists (MYCGC members)
These colorguards have medaled at WGI in their respective year and class. The following groups have been or are currently members of the Mid-York Circuit.

1978 Marcus Whitman, Rushville, New York – High School Champions
1979 Holley Hawks, Holley, New York – High School Champions
1980 Holley Hawks, Holley, New York – High School Champions
1981 Holley Hawks, Holley, New York – High School Champions
1983 Canandaigua HS, Candaigua, New York – High School Champions
1984 Cicero-North Syracuse HS, Cicero, New York – Scholastic Silver Medalist
1994 Trumansburg HS, Trumansburg, New York – SO Silver Medalist
1997 Patriots, Rochester, New York – IO Silver Medalist
1998 Patriots, Rochester, New York – IO Gold Medalist
2000 Brigadiers, Syracuse, New York – IO Silver Medalist
2004 Laurens Jaguars, Laurens, New York – SO Bronze Medalist
2006 Shenendehowa HS Var, Clifton Park, New York – SO Silver Medalist
2009 Cicero-North Syracuse HS Var., Cicero, New York – SA Gold Medalist
2014 Shenendehowa HS Var, Clifton Park, New York – IA Bronze Medalist
2016 Victor HS Blue Devils, Victor New York – SA Bronze Medalist
2016 Shenendehowa HS Var, Clifton Park, New York – SO Gold Medalist
2017 Cicero-North Syracuse HS Var, Cicero, New York - SO Bronze Medalist
2018 Syracuse Brigadiers, Syracuse, New York-IO Bronze Medalist

Old classes
This class system was used prior to 2000; now MYCGC is compliant with WGI classification.

High school winners (1965-1970) 

 1965 Sherburne HS, Sherburne, New York
1966 Sherburne HS, Sherburne, New York
1967 Sherburne HS, Sherburne, New York
1968 Sherburne HS, Sherburne, New York
1969 Unknown
1970 Unknown

Non-high school winners 

 1965 Magnificent Yankees, Utica, New York
1966 Magnificent Yankees, Utica, New York
1967 Titans, Frankfort, NY
1968 Titans, Frankfort, NY
1969 Unknown
1970 Unknown

B class winners (1974–1986) 
1974 Liverpool HS, Liverpool, New York
1975 Liverpool HS, Liverpool, New York
1976 Roxboro Road MS, North Syracuse, New York
1977 African Road JHS, Vestal, New York
1978 Roxboro Road MS, North Syracuse, New York
1979 Richfield Springs HS Kachinas, Richfield Springs, New York
1980 No B Class
1981 Oxford Academy, Oxford, NY
1982 Sidney Elite, Sidney, New York
1983 Trumansburg HS, Trumansburg, New York
1984 Kati Corps, Madison County, New York
1985 Madison HS, Madison, New York
1986 New Dimension B, Rochester, New York

A class winners (1971–1999)
1971 Tri-Town Cadets Rochester, New York 
1972 Sherburne-Earlville HS, Sherburne, New York
1973 Unknown
1974 West Genesee HS, Camillus, New York
1975 West Genesee HS, Camillus, New York
1976 Holley HS, Holley, New York
1977 Canandaigua Academy, Canandaigua, New York
1978 Marcus Whitman HS, Rushville, New York
1979 North Syracuse Central HS, North Syracuse, New York
1980 Roxboro Road MS, Mattydale, New York
1981 Marcus Whitman Jr., Rushville, New York
1982 Mont Pleasant HS, Schenectady, New York
1983 Union-Endicott HS, Endicott, New York
1984 Chenango Folks HS, Chenango Folks, New York
1985 Trumansburg HS, Trumansburg, New York
1986 Duanesburg HS, Duanesburg, New York
1987 Chenango Valley HS, Binghamton, New York
1988 Hamilton HS, Hamilton, New York
1989 Groton Hs, Groton, New York
1990 Paul V. Moore HS, Central Square, New York
1991 Dundee HS, Dundee, New York
1992 Penn Yan Academy, Penn Yan, New York
1993 Phoenix HS, Phoenix, New York
1994 Groton HS & Vestal HS, Groton & Vestal, New York-Tie*
1995 Sidney HS, Sidney, New York
1996 Sullivan County HS, LaPorte, Pennsylvania
1997 Mohonasen HS, Rotterdam, New York
1998 Oswego HS, Oswego, New York
1999 Syty Syghts, Syracuse, New York

AA class winners (1981–1999)
1981 Richfield Springs HS, Richfield Springs, New York
1982 Richfield Springs HS, Richfield Springs, New York
1983 Chruchville-Chili HS, Churchville, New York
1984 Silhouettes of Montreal, Montreal, Quebec, Canada
1985 Sherburne-Earlville HS, Sherburne, New York
1986 New Dimension A, Rochester, New York
1987 Marcus Whitman HS, Rushville, New York
1988 Naples HS, Naples, New York
1989 Laurens HS, Laurens, New York
1990 Herkimer HS, Herkimer, New York
1991 Groton HS, Groton, New York
1992 Campbell-Savona HS Royal Blue, Savona, New York
1993 Ithaca HS, Ithaca, New York
1994 North Syracuse JHS Nighthawks 9, North Syracuse, New York
1995 Shenendehowa HS, Clifton Park, New York
1996 Vestal HS, Vestal, New York
1997 Marcus Whitman HS, Rushville, New York
1998 Homer HS, Homer, New York
1999 Vestal HS, Vestal, New York

AAA class winners (1994–1999)
1994 Clinton HS, Clinton, New York
1995 Critical Acclaim, Ithaca, New York
1996 Royal Blue, Savona, New York
1997 Vestal HS, Vestal, New York
1998 APW HS, Parish, New York
1999 Baldwinsville Sr HS, Baldwinsville, New York

Open class (1980–1985)
1980 Marcus Whitman HS, Rushville, New York
1981 Marcus Whitman HS, Rushville, New York
1982 Marcus Whitman HS, Rushville, New York
1983 Canandaigua Academy, Canandaigua, New York
1984 Marcus Whitman HS, Rushville, New York
1985 Canandaigua Academy, Canandaigua, New York

National class (1986–1999)
1986 Cicero-North Syracuse HS, Cicero, New York
1987 Cicero-North Syracuse HS, Cicero, New York
1988 Cicero-North Syracuse HS, Cicero, New York
1989 Patriots, Rochester, New York
1990 Naples HS, Naples, New York
1991 Naples HS, Naples, New York
1992 Naples HS, Naples, New York
1993 Naples HS, Naples, New York
1994 Trumansburg Sr. HS, Trumansburg, New York
1995 Trumansburg Sr. HS, Trumansburg, New York
1996 Trumansburg Sr. HS, Trumansburg, New York
1997 Trumansburg Sr. HS, Trumansburg, New York
1998 Cicero-North Syracuse HS, Cicero, New York
1999 Phoenix Sr HS, Phoenix, New York

National Open (1999)
1999 Brigadiers, Syracuse, New York

References

External links
Mid-York CG Circuit Official Website

High school marching bands from the United States
Marching band competitions
Organizations established in 1965